Karl Gerok may refer to:

Karl Gerok (1815–1890), German theologian and lyricist
Karl Ludwig Gerok (1906–1975), German organist and composer
Friedrich von Gerok (officer), sometimes known by his first given name, Karl